Harlev Rectory is the rectory of the Harlev and Framlev pastorate and a listed building in Aarhus Municipality, Denmark. The rectory was completed in 1732 and was listed by the Danish Heritage Agency on 3 March 1950. Originally it was the rectory of the adjoining Gl. Harlev Church but the Harlev and Framlev pastorates have been merged so the priest today serve both parishes. The rectory is owned by the Church of Denmark along with the church itself.

Architecture 
The rectory consists of 3 buildings surrounding a central courtyard to the east, west and south. The 3 wings are typical for farms of the time. The buildings are half-timbered with whitewashed walls with exposed wooden supports and stand on a base of granite boulders. The roofs are thatched with straw with a ridged roof construction in the central building and a hip roof on the side wings. The main building features a dormer window above the main door and a wooden cornice running the length of all three buildings.

References

External links 
 Harlev-Framlev Pastorate Website
 

Listed buildings and structures in Aarhus Municipality
Clergy houses in Denmark
Timber framed buildings in Aarhus Municipality
Thatched buildings in Denmark
Houses completed in 1732